The following is a list of Columbia Lions men's basketball head coaches. There have been 23 head coaches of the Lions in their 122-season history.

Columbia's current head coach is Jim Engles. He was hired as the Lions' head coach in March 2019, replacing Kyle Smith, who left to become the head coach at San Francisco.

References

Columbia

Columbia Lions men's basketball coaches